Filipino-Australian singer-actor James Reid has released two studio albums, three extended plays, thirty-five singles (including six as a featured artist), three soundtrack albums, one mixtape and twenty-six music videos. After being named as the Big Winner of Pinoy Big Brother: Teen Clash 2010, he signed with Star Records and released We Are Whatever, a joint extended play with Bret Jackson, on iTunes.

In late 2012, Reid signed with Viva Records. He released his first solo extended play, James Reid in September 2013, accompanied by his debut single, "Alam Niya Ba". His second solo extended play, Reid Alert was released in February 2015. It is accompanied by three singles: "Huwag Ka Nang Humirit", "Hanap-Hanap", featuring his then-girlfriend Nadine Lustre, and "Randomantic".

In 2017, Reid founded the record label, Careless, and released his debut studio album, Palm Dreams. It is accompanied by three singles "Cool Down", "Turning Up", and "The Life". His second studio album, lovescene:, was released in October 2022. It is accompanied by the single "u & i".

Albums

Studio albums

Mixtapes

Soundtrack albums

Extended plays

Singles

As lead artist

As featured artist

Promotional singles

As songwriter

Music videos

References

Discographies of Filipino artists
Pop music discographies
Rhythm and blues discographies